The 1985 IIHF Asian Oceanic Junior U18 Championship was the second edition of the IIHF Asian Oceanic Junior U18 Championship. It took place between 28 January and 2 February 1985 in Seoul, South Korea. The tournament was won by Japan, who claimed their second title by finishing first in the standings. South Korea and Australia finished second and third respectively.

Standings

Fixtures
Reference

References

External links
 International Ice Hockey Federation

IIHF Asian Oceanic U18 Championships
Asian
International ice hockey competitions hosted by South Korea